Tuomainen is a surname. Notable people with the surname include:

Johanna Tuomainen, Finnish chess master
Marko Tuomainen (born 1972), Finnish ice hockey player
Miikka Tuomainen (born 1986), Finnish ice hockey player
Raimo Tuomainen (born 1957), Finnish health sociologist